Machavaram is a village in Medak district in the state of Telangana in India.

References 

Villages in Medak district